Manuel Martínez Coronado (1964 or 1965 – 10 February 1998) was a Guatemalan mass murderer, convicted for the killing of seven people on 17 May 1995. Coronado was sentenced to death for the murders, and was executed in 1998, the first execution by lethal injection in Guatemala.

Background 
Manuel Martínez Coronado was a member of the Chortí ethnic group who worked as a peasant farmer.

Murders
Coronado murdered seven members of the same family on 17 May 1995 over a land dispute. He was aided by his stepfather, Daniel Arias. The victims were Juan Bautista Arias, 58, his wife Rosalbina Miguel, their children Francias, 12, Jovita, 8, Arnoldo, 5, and Aníbal, 2, and his sister, Emilia Arias, 68.

Arrest and execution 
Coronado was arrested and charged with multiple counts of homicide. Following a brief trial, he became the first Guatemalan to be sentenced to death by means of lethal injection (which had recently been legalized by the government). Too old to be executed, Arias, who was in his mid 60s, was sentenced to 30 years in prison. Amnesty International attempted to suggest that Arias had been the triggerman in the murders.

Despite pleas from Amnesty International to overturn the verdict, the Guatemalan authorities ruled that his sentence would be upheld. The execution took place at 6 a.m. (12:00 – GMT) on 10 February 1998, and was broadcast live as a national television event. It took eighteen minutes for him to die from the onset of drug administration; the sounds of his wife and children crying could be heard by the television audience throughout the ordeal.

Coronado's mother claimed that he converted to Christianity on death row and had asked God for forgiveness.

Criticism

Amnesty International, which had protested his death sentence, complained that doctors carrying out the execution was a "breach of medical ethics" and that Guatemalan authorities refused to release the identities of the healthcare workers who carried out the execution.

See also
 List of rampage killers
 Capital punishment in Guatemala
Other executions
 Roberto Girón and Pedro Castillo
 Amilcar Cetino Perez and Tomas Cerrate Hernandez

References

External links
 Photos: Execution of Manuel Martinez Coronado, Roberto Giron and Pedro Castillo
"Guatemala: First Ever Execution By Lethal Injection Carried Out - 1998." Associated Press.
"Guatemala - Man executed by lethal injection." Associated Press.

1960s births
1998 deaths
20th-century executions by Guatemala
Executed Guatemalan people
Executed mass murderers
Family murders
Filmed executions
Guatemalan mass murderers
Guatemalan Maya people
Guatemalan murderers of children
Guatemalan people convicted of murder
People convicted of murder by Guatemala
People executed by Guatemala by lethal injection